Ivan Dimitrovski (Macedonian: Иван Димитровски) (born 2 April 1998) is a Macedonian handball player who plays for RK Eurofarm Pelister 2.

References 
http://www.gol.mk/rakomet/mladiot-ivan-chekori-po-stapkite-na-negoviot-tatko-zlatko-dimitrovski

1998 births
Living people
Macedonian male handball players
People from Bitola